This is a demography of the population of the United States Virgin Islands including population density, ethnicity, education level, health of the populace, economic status, religious affiliations and other aspects of the population.

Population 

The population of the US Virgin Island: The median age is 39.2 years (38.5 for males, 39.7 for females) (2010 census).

Vital statistics

Structure of the population 

Census - including armed forces stationed in the area:

Health
The infant mortality rate as of 2010 is 7.4 deaths/1,000 live births: 8.14 deaths/1,000 live births for males and 6.63 deaths/1,000 live births for females. At birth, life expectancy is 79.61 years (76.57 for males, 82.83 for females or girls).

Ethnicity and religion

As of the 2010 census, the population comprised the following ethnic groups:
Black or African American 76%
White 15.7%
Asian 1.4%
Other 4.9%
Mixed 2.1%
 
By place of birth:
U.S. Virgin Islands 46.7%
St. Croix 23.8%
St. Thomas 22.5%
St. John 0.4%
Latin America and the Caribbean 34.7%
St. Kitts and Nevis 5.6%
Dominica 5.0%
Dominican Republic 4.2%
Antigua and Barbuda 3.7%
Puerto Rico 3.3%
St. Lucia 3.3%
British Virgin Islands 1.9%
Trinidad and Tobago 1.6%
Haiti 1.6%
Anguilla 0.8%
Jamaica 0.5%
Other Latin American and the Caribbean 3.1%
United States 15.8%
Asia 1.4%
Europe 0.9%
Other 0.4%

In terms of religion:
Protestant 59%
Baptist 42%
Episcopalian 17% 
Roman Catholic Church 34% 
Other 7%

Language
As of the 2010 languages spoken in the US Virgin Islands were:
English 71.6%
Spanish or Spanish Creole 17.2%
French or French Creole 8.6%
Other 2.5%

See also
 United States Virgin Islander citizenship and nationality
 Stateside Virgin Islands Americans

References

 
Virgin Islands
Society of the United States Virgin Islands